Pink and Black Records is an imprint record label of Fat Wreck Chords created to distribute albums from female-fronted bands.  The first record released on this label was the Dance Hall Crashers album Purr in 1999. Pink & Black is named for the two favorite colors of Erin Burkett, ex-wife of Fat Mike, and one of the founders of Fat Wreck Chords.

Bands
 Dance Hall Crashers
 Fabulous Disaster
 The Flipsides

See also
 List of record labels

External links
 Official site

Punk record labels
Fat Wreck Chords
Defunct record labels of the United States